Tang-e Kureh-ye Sofla (also Romanized as Tang-e Kūreh-ye Sofla) is a village in Zalaqi-ye Sharqi Rural District, Besharat District, Aligudarz County, Lorestan Province, Iran. At the 2006 census, its population was 35, in 8 families.

References 

Towns and villages in Aligudarz County